The School District of Webb City R-7 (or Webb City R-7 School District) is a school district headquartered in Webb City, Jasper County, Missouri, USA. The Webb City R-7 School District is very highly regarded and was ranked 3rd nationally in its class in 2010. The school district is overseen by Superintendent Dr. Anthony Rossetti. The Webb City R-7 School District serves Alba. Carterville, Oronogo, Purcell, Webb City, and some unincorporated portions of Jasper County.

List of schools

High schools
 Webb City High School has an enrollment of 1,173 students grades 9-12. According to the 2013 U.S. News & World Report, Webb City High School is ranked as the 17th best high school out of 560 in the state of Missouri. Webb City High School is housed in a building that was originally constructed in 1968. The school is highly rated academically. The school is well known for its academic activities including Speech and Debate, Academic Bowl, and Future Business Leaders of America (FBLA). Its marching band has been very successful in competition and was invited to perform in the 2006 and 2010 Rose Parade. The high school is perhaps best known for its sports program which has won eleven football championships, two baseball and softball championships, and one championship in boys' and girls' basketball since 1989.
 There is also an alternative high school that caters to non-traditional students who care for their children, work, or have problems in a regular learning environment.

Junior high

 Webb City Junior High School supports students in grades 7-8. The school is housed in a building that was originally the high school and was erected in 1909.

Middle school

Webb City Middle School supports students in graded 5-6. It is also called the 5th-6th Grade Center. The school is organized in as a middle school. Classrooms are organized in "pods" with four classrooms sharing a common area. Students stay with their homeroom teacher for the language arts and math and rotate to different teachers for science and social studies.
6th Grade Center was a transition school when the district was changing from having elementary schools with students K-6, and the current model with schools housing only two grades. It was created to open up classroom space at the elementary schools because of over-crowding and was housed in an addition to the current junior high. The school existed from the 1993-1994 school year through the 1996-1997 school year when students were moved to the newly completed middle school.

Elementary schools
Webb City primary schools are organized in two categories:  outlying "country schools" and the central schools. The central schools have students divided among different building for the following grade sets: K, 1-2, and 3-4. The outlying country schools contain students grades K-4.  The country schools are in communities that used to have their own school districts and were later incorporated into the Webb City R-7 district.  The elementary school is a center of the community.  Students typically walk to school. community events are held in the buildings, and parents participate in the classrooms. Thus, when the grades were distributed among different buildings, the two outlying schools retained their K-5 status (with 5th grade eventually being moved to the middle school).
 Madge T. James Kindergarten Center — Kindergarten
 Bess Truman Primary School — grades K-1 
Carterville Elementary School — grades K-4 
Webster School — grades 1,2
 Harry S Truman Elementary School — grades 2-4 
 Eugene Field Elementary School — grades 3,4
 Mark Twain Elementary School — grades 3,4

Early childhood education and parenting
 Franklin Early Childhood Center — pre-kindergarten

Recognition 
In 2010, the district was ranked 3rd best nationally in communities with median home prices below $100,000.
GreatSchools wrote:
"The Webb City High School Cardinals are nearly invincible in football; they've won eleven state championships in the past 25 years. Academically, Webb City schools are recognized as an "outperformer" by Standard and Poor's because they've exceeded state expectations in 13 of the past 14 years. Webb City taxpayers are willing to invest in scholastic excellence — they recently approved a $2 million bond to build four additional classrooms."

References

External links
 School District of Webb City R-7

School districts in Missouri
Education in Jasper County, Missouri
School districts established in 1877
1877 establishments in Missouri